Ernie Bell (22 July 1918 – 1968) was an English professional footballer who played in the Football League for Hull City and Mansfield Town.

References

1918 births
1968 deaths
English footballers
Association football forwards
English Football League players
Scarborough F.C. players
Hull City A.F.C. players
Mansfield Town F.C. players
Aldershot F.C. players
Footballers from Kingston upon Hull